José Antonio Alonso Navarro is a philologist, university professor of English and English literature, and European literature in general.

In addition, he is a medievalist, a translator, and a writer. He was born in Madrid (Spain) in 1965. Navarro holds a BA in English Philology from the Complutense University of Madrid (Spain) and a PhD in English Philology from the Coruña University (Spain). He wrote a doctoral dissertation about the afterlife in Medieval Europe, and included a complete comparative analysis of two medieval texts on the afterlife within the same genre. He was awarded the "CUM LAUDE" accolade.

On 21 March 2017 Nick White, Deputy Head of Mission and Chargé d´Affaires at the British Embassy of Asuncion, Paraguay, awarded Navarro a Certificate of Honor on behalf of the British Ambassador in Asuncion, Jeremy Hobbs due to his outstanding contribution to the translation and spread of Medieval English Literature in both Spain and Paraguay for almost 20 years.

The French Hispanist Professor Dr. Marie Christine Seguin from the Catholic Institute of Toulouse published a study on the poetry of José Antonio Alonso Navarro dedicated to Friar Leopoldo of Alpandeire in Inter-Lignes: Autumn Number 2021 (27) titled in French Crises, Mutations, Recompositions. The number  2021 (27) was released in 2023.

Some works as a writer 
 Paraguayan Pearls. Álamo. 1999.
 Soly Luna. Arandurá. 2000.
 Llanto de Niño Gris. Arandurá. 2001.
 Che ñahati-i paraguaya. Arandurá. 2003.
 Arroyos y Esteros. Etigraf. 2003.
 Réquiem por Atocha. Nueva Dramaturgia Malagueña. 2.005.
 Málaga en Picasso. Universidad Autónoma de Asunción (Imprenta Salesiana). 2006.
 Como agua cristalina. Universidad Autónoma de Asunción (Marben Editora). 2018.
 Yerutíes de terciopelo negro y rojo. Arandurá. 2002.
 Bálsamo de Alpandeire. Universidad Autónoma de Asunción (Marben Editora). 2019.
 Juan Manuel Marcos:Un periplo por su voz poética. Asunción UniNorte. 2019.
 Poem To my Father. El Parlante digital. 2020.
 Sigo siendo en ti. Benmar. Asunción, Paraguay. 2021.
 Olivo de mi Ser. Rosalba. Asunción, Paraguay. 2022.
 
  Romance of my Sailboat. Poem of Nothingness. De Sur a Sur Ediciones. 2023.

Some translations of medieval texts written in "Middle English" 

  Sir Gowther
  Piers Ploughman's creed
  Piers Ploughman's creed (verses 1-883)
  The Vision of Tundal
 The gast of Gy
 The flower and the leaf
 Marian lyrics
 Sir Owain
 Sir Cleges
  Sir Degaré
 Sir Isumbras
 Translation into Spanish of "Sir Corneus"
 Translation into Spanish of "The Isle of Ladies"
 Sir Eglamour of Artois
 The Tale of the Basin
 The Lady Prioress
 Sir Launfal
 Friar Daw's Reply
 Jack Upland
 Sir Orfeo
 Jack and his Stepdame
 Translation of Medieval English texts into Spanish which offer a negative image of marriage (Journal - Ñemityra 2021)
 Translation of Old English riddles into Spanish (The Riddle Ages).

References 

Spanish philologists
1965 births
Living people